The Kŭmgol Line is an electrified standard-gauge secondary line of the North Korean State Railway running from Yŏhaejin on the P'yŏngra Line to Muhak.
Located entirely in Tanch'ŏn city, South Hamgyŏng - one of the DPRK's most important mining areas - freight trains moving ore from the mines on the line to the P'yŏngra Line form the bulk of the line's traffic.

The line is in relatively severe terrain, with a ruling grade of 26‰.

History

Originally called the Hamnam Line, it was built by the privately-owned Chosen Magnesite Development Railway (Japanese: 朝鮮マグネサイト開発鉄道 Chōsen Magunesaito Kaihatsu Tetsudō, Korean: 조선 마그네사이트 개발 철도, Chosŏn Magŭnesaitŭ Kaebal Ch'ŏldo), to exploit the magnesite deposits of the Kŏmdŏk district; the company was granted a licence to operate passenger trains on 25 March 1943. The first section, 27.7 km from Yŏhaejin on the P'yŏngra Line to Tongam, was opened on 30 March 1943, followed by a 32 km extension from Tongam to Ryongyang (nowadays called Paekkŭmsan) that was opened on 4 December of the same year.

After the partition of Korea following the end of World War 2 and the subsequent establishment of the DPRK, the line was nationalised and its name was changed to the current name. In 1961-62 the line, which by that time was outdated in technical terms, was upgraded with modern equipment; at the same time, a  extension from Paekkŭmsan to Kŭmgol was built. The entire line was then electrified in 1977, improving the total capacity, safety and train speeds on the line. The final  extension from Kŭmgol to Muhak was built after 1988.

Services

Freight
Freight movements make up by far the largest amount of traffic on the Kŭmgol Line, with the bulk of that traffic moving from Kŭmgol to the connection with the P'yŏngra Line at Yŏhaejin - the vast majority of that traffic being magnesite ore from Paekkŭmsan and non-ferrous ores from the Kŏmdŏk Mining Complex. Northbound traffic is mainly coal, construction materials, foodstuffs and empty cars for ore-loading.

Passenger

The following passenger trains are known to operate on this line:

 Express trains 11/12, operating between P'yŏngyang and Kŭmgol, runs on this line between Yŏhaejin and Kŭmgol;
 Local trains 513/516 operate on this line between Kŭmgol and Muhak;
 Local trains 913/914 operate on this line between Tonsan and Paekkŭmsan.

Route
A yellow background in the "Distance" box indicates that section of the line is not electrified.

References

Railway lines in North Korea
Standard gauge railways in North Korea
Railway lines opened in 1943
1943 establishments in Korea